George Maurice Muir (11 January 1896 – 4 August 1959) was an Australian rules footballer who played with Carlton and Fitzroy in the Victorian Football League (VFL).

Notes

External links 

George Muir's profile at Blueseum

1896 births
1959 deaths
Australian rules footballers from Melbourne
Carlton Football Club players
Fitzroy Football Club players
People from Carlton, Victoria